Jean-Paul Charles Belmondo (9 April 19336 September 2021) was a French actor. Initially associated with the New Wave of the 1960s, he was a major French film star for several decades from the 1960s onward. His best known credits include Breathless (1960), That Man from Rio (1964), Pierrot le Fou (1965), Borsalino (1970), and The Professional (1981). He was most notable for portraying police officers in action thriller films and became known for his unwillingness to appear in English-language films, despite being heavily courted by Hollywood. An undisputed box-office champion like Louis de Funès and Alain Delon of the same period, Belmondo attracted nearly 160 million spectators in his 50-year career. Between 1969 and 1982, he played four times in the most popular films of the year in France: The Brain (1969), Fear Over the City (1975), Animal (1977), Ace of Aces (1982), being surpassed on this point only by Louis de Funès. The popularity of Jean-Paul Belmondo as actor is mainly due to the characters he interpreted in his movies, loving to highlight the viril man, fighter, but also brave and heroic, which appealed to a wide audience in France but also abroad.

During his career, he was called the French counterpart of actors such as James Dean, Marlon Brando, and Humphrey Bogart. Described as an icon and national treasure of France, Belmondo was seen as an influential actor of French cinema and an important figure in shaping European cinema. In 1989, Belmondo won the César Award for Best Actor for his performance in Itinéraire d'un enfant gâté. He was nominated for two BAFTA Awards throughout his career. In 2011 and then in 2017, he received a lifetime achievement honor: the Palme d'honneur during the Cannes Film Festival and a César d'honneur 42nd César Awards.

Early life
Jean-Paul Belmondo was born in Neuilly-sur-Seine, a suburb of Paris, on 9 April 1933. Belmondo's father, Paul Belmondo, was a Pied-Noir sculptor who was born in Algeria of Italian descent, whose parents were of Sicilian and Piedmontese origin. His mother, 
Sarah Madeleine Rainaud-Richard, was a painter. As a boy, he was more interested in sport than school, developing a particular interest in boxing and soccer.

Belmondo made his amateur boxing debut on 10 May 1949 in Paris when he knocked out René Desmarais in one round. Belmondo's boxing career was undefeated, but brief. He won three straight first-round knockout victories from 1949 to 1950. "I stopped when the face I saw in the mirror began to change", he later said.

He did his National Service in French North Africa where he hit himself with a rifle butt to end his military service.

Belmondo was interested in acting. His late teenage years were spent at a private drama school, and he began performing comedy sketches in the provinces. He studied under Raymond Giraud and then attended the Conservatoire of Dramatic Arts when he was twenty. He studied there for three years. He would probably have won the prize for best actor, but participated in a sketch mocking the school, which offended the jury; this resulted in his only getting an honourable mention, "which nearly set off a riot among his incensed fellow students" in August 1956, according to one report. The incident made front-page news.

Career

1950s

Belmondo's acting career properly began in 1953, with two performances at the Théâtre de l'Atelier in Paris in Jean Anouilh's Médée and Georges Neveux's Zamore. Belmondo began touring the provinces with friends including Annie Girardot and Guy Bedos.

Belmondo first appeared in the short Moliere (1956). His first film role was a scene with Jean-Pierre Cassel in On Foot, on Horse, and on Wheels (1957), which was cut from the final film; however he had a bigger part in the follow up A Dog, a Mouse, and a Sputnik (1958).

Belmondo had a small role in the comedy Be Beautiful But Shut Up (1958), appearing with Alain Delon, followed by a role as a gangster in Young Sinners (1958), directed by Marcel Carné.

Belmondo supported Bourvil and Arletty in Sunday Encounter (1958). Jean-Luc Godard directed him in a short, Charlotte and Her Boyfriend (1958), where Belmondo's voice was dubbed by Godard after Belmondo was conscripted into the army. As part of his compulsory military service, he served in Algeria as a private for six months.

Belmondo's first lead role was in Les Copains du dimanche (1958). He later had a supporting part in An Angel on Wheels (1959) with Romy Schneider then appeared in Web of Passion (1959) for Claude Chabrol. He played D'Artagnan in The Three Musketeers (1959) for French television.

1960s

Belmondo starred in Consider All Risks (1960), a gangster story with Lino Ventura. He then played the lead role in Jean-Luc Godard's Breathless (À Bout de Souffle, 1960), which made him a major figure in the French New Wave.

Breathless was a major success in France and overseas and launched Belmondo internationally and as the face of the New Wave – even though, as he said "I don't know what they mean" when people used that term. In the words of The New York Times it led to his having "more acting assignments than he can handle."

He followed it with Trapped by Fear (1960), then the Italian film Letters By a Novice (1960). With Jeanne Moreau and director Peter Brook he made Seven Days... Seven Nights (1961) which he later called "very boring."

Belmondo appeared as a gigolo in the anthology film Love and the Frenchwoman (1960). Then he made two Italian films, supporting Sophia Loren in Two Women (1961) as a bespectacled country boy ("It may disappoint those who've got me typed" said Belmondo. "But so much the better."), then opposite Claudia Cardinale in The Lovemakers (1961).

Two Women and Breathless were widely seen in the United States and the UK. In 1961, The New York Times called him "the most impressive young French actor since the advent of the late Gérard Philipe".

He was reunited with Godard for A Woman Is a Woman (1961) and made another all-star anthology comedy, Famous Love Affairs (1961).

Later, he acted in Jean-Pierre Melville's philosophical movie Léon Morin, Priest (1961), playing a priest. He was a retired gangster in A Man Named Rocca (1962), then had a massive hit with the swashbuckler Cartouche (1962), directed by Philippe de Broca. Also popular was A Monkey in Winter (1962), a comedy where he and Jean Gabin played alcoholics.

François Truffaut wanted Belmondo to play the lead in an adaptation of Fahrenheit 451. This did not happen (the film was made several years later with Oskar Werner); instead Belmondo made two movies with Jean-Pierre Melville: the film noir crime film The Fingerman (Le Doulos, 1963) and Magnet of Doom (1963). He co-starred with Gina Lollobrigida in Mad Sea (1963) and appeared in another comedy anthology, Sweet and Sour (1963). There was some controversy when he was arrested for insulting a policeman, when the policeman was charged with assaulting Belmondo.

Banana Peel (1963), with Jeanne Moreau, was a popular comedy. Even more successful was the action-adventure tale That Man from Rio (1964), directed by Philippe de Broca - a massive hit in France, and popular overseas as well. A 1965 profile compared him to Humphrey Bogart and James Dean. It stated Belmondo was:
A later manifestation of youthful rejection... His disengagement from a society his parents made is total. He accepts corruption with a cynical smile, not even bothering to struggle. He is out entirely for himself, to get whatever he can, while he can. The Belmondo type is capable of anything. He knows he is defeated anyway... He represents something tough yet vulnerable, laconic but intense, notably lacking in neuroses or the stumbling insecurities of homus Americanus. He is the man of the moment, completely capable of taking care of himself - and ready to take on the girl of the moment too.
Belmondo's own tastes ran to Tintin comics, sports magazines, and detective novels. He said he preferred "making adventure films like Rio to the intellectual movies of Alain Resnais or Alain Robbe-Grillet. But with François Truffaut I'd be willing to try." His fee was said to be between US$150,000-$200,000 per film. Belmondo said he was open to making Hollywood films but he wanted to play an American rather than a Frenchman and was interested in Cary Grant type roles instead of James Dean/Bogart ones.

Belmondo made Greed in the Sun (1964) with Lino Ventura for director Henri Verneuil, who said Belmondo was "one of the few young actors in France who is young and manly." Backfire (1964) reunited him with Jean Seberg, his Breathless co-star. After a role in Male Hunt (1964) he played the lead in Weekend at Dunkirk (1965), another big hit in France.

Belmondo dominated the French box office for 1964 – That Man from Rio was the fourth most popular movie in the country, Greed in the Sun was seventh, Weekend at Dunkirk ninth, and Backfire 19th.

Crime on a Summer Morning (1965) was less successful, though it still performed well on the strength of Belmondo's name. Up to His Ears (1965) was an attempt to repeat the popularity of That Man Rio, from the same director, but did less well.

There were Hollywood offers, but Belmondo turned them down. "He won't make films outside of France", said director Mark Robson, who wanted him for Lost Command (1966). "He has scripts stacked up and he doesn't see why he should jeopardise his great success by speaking English instead of French."

Belmondo was reunited with Godard for Pierrot le Fou (1965) then made a comedy, Tender Scoundrel (1966). He had small roles in two predominantly English speaking films, Is Paris Burning? (1966) and Casino Royale (1967).

After making The Thief of Paris (1967) for Louis Malle, Belmondo took an acting hiatus for over a year. "One day it seemed that life was passing me by", he said. "I didn't want to work. So I stopped. Then one day I felt like starting again. So I started."

Belmondo spent three months of that time off in Hollywood but did not accept any offers. He did not want to learn English and appear in English-language films:
Every Frenchman dreams of making a Western, of course but America has plenty of good actors. I'm not being falsely modest but why would they need me? I prefer a national film to an international film. Something is lost. Look at what happened to Italy when they went international.

Belmondo returned to filmmaking with the crime movie, Ho! (1968), then had a massive hit with a comedy co-starring David Niven, The Brain (1969). He later appeared in Mississippi Mermaid (1969) for François Truffaut with Catherine Deneuve and the romantic drama Love Is a Funny Thing (1969).

1970s

Belmondo starred alongside Alain Delon in Borsalino (1970), a successful gangster film. The latter produced the film and Belmondo ended up suing Delon over billing.

The Married Couple of the Year Two (1971) was also popular; even more so was The Burglars (1971).

Inspired by the success Alain Delon had producing his own films, Belmondo formed his own production company, Cerito Films (named after his grandmother, Rosina Cerrito), to develop movies for Belmondo. The first Cerito film was the black comedy Dr. Popaul (1972), with Mia Farrow, the biggest hit to date for director Claude Chabrol.

La scoumoune (1972) was a new version of A Man Named Rocca (1961). The Inheritor (1973) was an action film; Le Magnifique (1974), a satiric action romance reunited him with Philippe de Broca.

He produced as well as starred in Stavisky (1974). Then he made a series of purely commercial films: Incorrigible (1974), Fear Over the City (1975; one of Belmondo's biggest hits of the decade and the first time he played a policeman on screen), Hunter Will Get You (1976), and Body of My Enemy (1977). Animal (1977) cast him as a stuntman opposite Raquel Welch and he starred as a policeman in Cop or Hood (1979).

1980s

In 1980, Belmondo starred in another comedy, Le Guignolo. He was a secret service agent in The Professional (1981) and a pilot in Ace of Aces (1982).

"What intellectuals don't like is success", said Belmondo. "Success in France is always looked down on, not by the public, but by intellectuals. If I'm nude in a film, that's fine for the intellectuals. But if I jump from a helicopter, they think it's terrible."

Belmondo kept to commercial films: Le Marginal (1983) as a policeman, Les Morfalous (1984) as a sergeant in the French Foreign Legion, Hold-Up (1985) as a bank robber, and Le Solitaire (1987), again playing another policeman in the last one, the latter one was a big box office disappointment and Belmondo returned to theatre shortly afterwards.

In 1987, he returned to the theatre after a 26-year absence in a production of Kean, adapted by Jean-Paul Sartre from the novel by Alexandre Dumas. "I did theatre for 10 years before going into movies and every year I planned to go back", he recalled. "I returned before I became an old man."

For Claude Lelouch, Belmondo starred in and co-produced Itinerary of a Spoiled Child (1988). For his performance in the film, also titled as  Itineraire d'un Enfant Gate, he won a César.

Belmondo claimed there were "several reasons" why he made fewer films in the 1980s. "I'm now a producer so it takes time to organise things", he said. "But it's also difficult to find good screenplays in France. We have serious writing problems here. And I'd prefer to do theatre for a long time than take on a mediocre film."

1990s and later career
In 1990, he played the title role in Cyrano de Bergerac on the stage in Paris, another highly successful production. He had a small role in One Hundred and One Nights (1995) then the lead in Lelouch's version of Les Misérables (1995). He also appeared in the comedy Désiré (1996), Une chance sur deux (1998), and in the science fiction comedy Peut-être (1999).

In 2009, Belmondo starred in A Man and His Dog ("Un homme et son chien"), his final film role. Despite his difficulty in walking and speaking, he played a character who had the same disability. Following this film he was forced into retirement in 2011 having earlier suffered a stroke in 2001.

Honours and awards

In 1989, Belmondo won the César Award for Best Actor for his performance in Itinéraire d'un enfant gâté.

Belmondo was made a Chevalier (Knight) of the Ordre National du Mérite, promoted to Officier (Officer) in 1986 and promoted to Commandeur (Commander) in 1994. He was also made a Chevalier (Knight) of the Ordre National de la Légion d'Honneur, promoted Officier (Officer) in 1991, and promoted to Commandeur (Commander) in 2007.

During his career, he was nominated for two BAFTA awards.

Belmondo received several honorary awards – Palme d'Or at the 2011 Cannes Film Festival, Golden Lion at the 2016 Venice Film Festival, and César in 2017. In 2009, the Los Angeles Film Critics Association gave him a career achievement award.

In 2017, he was received a lifetime achievement honor at the 42nd César Awards accompanied by a two-minute standing ovation.

Personal life and death
On 4 December 1952, Belmondo married Élodie Constantin, with whom he had three children: Patricia (1953–1993), who was killed in a fire, Florence (born 1958), and Paul (born 1963). Belmondo and Constantin separated in 1965. She filed for divorce in September 1966, and it was finalised on 5 January 1968.

He had relationships with Ursula Andress from 1965 to 1972, Laura Antonelli from 1972 to 1980, Brazilian actress and singer Maria Carlos Sotto Mayor from 1980 to 1987, and Barbara Gandolfi from 2008 to 2012.

In 1989, Belmondo was in his mid-50s when he met 24-year-old dancer Natty Tardivel. The couple lived together for over a decade before marrying in 2002. On 13 August 2003, Tardivel gave birth to then 70-year-old Belmondo's fourth child, Stella Eva Angelina. Belmondo and Tardivel divorced in 2008.

Belmondo was a supporter of football club Paris Saint-Germain.

Belmondo died on 6 September 2021 at his home in Paris, aged 88. He had been in failing health since he suffered a stroke a decade before. A national tribute was held on 9 September in Hôtel des Invalides. President Emmanuel Macron called Belmondo a "national hero". The last tribute melody was "Chi Mai" by Ennio Morricone (from The 1981 film The Professional). The next day, 10 September, his funeral took place at the Saint-Germain-des-Prés church in the presence of relatives and family. The actors Alain and Anthony Delon also were present. His remains were cremated at the Père Lachaise Cemetery, and his ashes are buried alongside his father, the sculptor Paul Belmondo, at the Montparnasse Cemetery.

Legacy

Throughout his career, he was called the French counterpart of actors such as James Dean, Marlon Brando, and Humphrey Bogart. On the day of his death, television channels in France altered their schedules to add screenings of his films, which drew over 6.5 million viewers cumulatively. For his performances as a police officer in many films, the National Police said that "Even if it was just cinema you were in a way one of us, Mr. Belmondo". Throughout his career, he was regarded as an influential French actor and was often seen as the face of the French New Wave. Belmondo was described as the "figurehead" of the French New Wave, with his acting techniques often seen as capturing the style and imagination of France in the 1960s.

Many of his film roles, especially as Michel Poiccard, were regarded as "legendary" and highly influential. Despite his reluctance to learn English, many often believed had he accepted offers from Hollywood, his success there would have been comparable to that of French actors Charles Boyer or Maurice Chevalier. In an obituary for The Guardian, they hailed Belmondo as an "integral part of the history of French cinema, and France itself". He was described as the "epitome of cool".

American film director Quentin Tarantino cited Belmondo as an influence and called Belmondo "a verb that represents vitality, charisma, a force of will, it represents super coolness". English director Edgar Wright said that "cinema will never be quite as cool again" following Belmondo's death. He was described as an icon of French cinema and being influential in shaping modern European cinema.

Selected filmography

See also
 Cinema of France

References

External links

 
 
 

1933 births
2021 deaths
People from Neuilly-sur-Seine
French male film actors
French male stage actors
French film producers
Best Actor César Award winners
Commanders of the Ordre national du Mérite
Commandeurs of the Légion d'honneur
French people of Italian descent
French people of Sicilian descent
People of Piedmontese descent
20th-century French male actors
21st-century French male actors
French National Academy of Dramatic Arts alumni
Burials at Montparnasse Cemetery